Alec McKenzie (4 July 1882 – 27 May 1968) was an Australian rules footballer who played for the Geelong Football Club in the Victorian Football League (VFL).

Notes

External links 

		

1882 births
1968 deaths
Australian rules footballers from Victoria (Australia)
Geelong Football Club players
Warrnambool Football Club players
People from Warrnambool